The 1954–55 season was Cardiff City F.C.'s 28th season in the Football League. They competed in the 22-team Division One, then the first tier of English football, finishing twentieth.

Season review

Partial league table

Results by round

FA Cup
Entering the competition in the third round, Cardiff were eliminated by fellow First Division side Arsenal after a 1–0 defeat.

Welsh Cup
After wins over Pembroke Borough and Newport County, Cardiff were knocked out of the competition in the semi-finals for a third year in a row after a 2–0 defeat to Chester City.

Players

Fixtures and results

First Division

FA Cup

Welsh Cup

See also
List of Cardiff City F.C. seasons

References

Cardiff City F.C. seasons
Association football clubs 1954–55 season
Card